Liberian passports are issued to Liberian citizens to travel outside Liberia.

Physical properties
 Surname
 Given names
 Nationality Liberian
 Date of birth 
 Sex  
 Place of birth  
 Date of Expiry 
 Passport number
 Height
 County of origin   
 NID number

Languages

The data page/information page is printed in English and French.

See also 
 ECOWAS passports
 List of passports
 Liberian nationality law
 Visa requirements for Liberian citizens

References

Passports by country
Government of Liberia